Greystone Golf & Country Club is a private 36-hole golf club in the southeastern United States, located in Hoover, Alabama, a suburb southeast of Birmingham.

Opened  in 1991, the first of the two courses was the Founders Course, designed by Bob Cupp and Hubert Green. The Legacy Course opened in 2000, designed by Rees Jones. The Legacy Course is currently ranked #89 in Golf Week's Top 100 Residential Courses.

From 1992–2005, the club hosted the Bruno's Memorial Classic on the senior tour. The Founders Course was so beloved by the players, officials, and media that they voted it in a Sports Illustrated poll as the #1 stop on the tour two years in a row.

Since 2016, the Founders Course has hosted the Regions Traditions, a senior major championship. It had been held nearby at Shoal Creek for the previous five editions.

References

External links

Bob Cupp Inc.

Landmarks in Alabama
Golf clubs and courses in Alabama
Sports in Hoover, Alabama
Buildings and structures in Jefferson County, Alabama
1991 establishments in Alabama
Sports venues completed in 1991